Scanlan Fountain is an 1891 cast iron fountain, installed in Houston's Sam Houston Park, in the U.S. state of Texas. The fountain was installed in the park in 1972. It was cast by J. L. Mott Iron Works  1880 and held by a private individual before being donated to the city by the family of the owner.

See also

 List of public art in Houston

References

External links
 

1891 establishments in Texas
1891 sculptures
Fountains in Texas
Outdoor sculptures in Houston